Lyon Street School, also known as Peru District School No. 4, is a historic one-room school building located in Peru, Clinton County, New York.  It was built about 1880, and is a one-story, wood-frame building measuring 24 feet wide and 35 feet long with Late Victorian style design elements.  It has a front gable roof with overhanging eaves and topped by an open, hip roofed belfry. The school closed in 1938.

It was listed on the National Register of Historic Places in 2013.

References

One-room schoolhouses in New York (state)
School buildings on the National Register of Historic Places in New York (state)
Victorian architecture in New York (state)
School buildings completed in 1836
Buildings and structures in Clinton County, New York
National Register of Historic Places in Clinton County, New York